Angela Visser (born 18 October 1966) is a Dutch actress, model and beauty queen who was crowned Miss Universe 1989. She was the first Dutch woman to win the title of the Miss Universe in 1989. Visser, who had previously worked as a model and beautician, was crowned Miss Holland in August 1988.

On May 5, 1990, together with the then mayor of Rotterdam Bram Peper, she opened the European Walk of Fame. She was also the first to get her own tile along with Lee Towers.

Miss Universe
A few months prior, she competed at Miss World 1988, but did not make it into the top ten. Then, at Miss Universe 1989, Angela swept all three semi-finals competitions and it was obvious she was the virtually unanimous choice of the judges. Placing second after her was Louise Drevenstam of Sweden, with delegates from the United States, Poland and Mexico following. Rounding up the top ten were the delegates from Germany, Venezuela, Finland, Jamaica, and Chile.

Filmography
After her reign, Visser came back to the pageant to be its color commentator (from 1991 to 1994). She has also appeared in films such as Hot Under the Collar, Killer Tomatoes Eat France!, and on television shows:

References

External links

 

1966 births
Dutch beauty pageant winners
Dutch female models
Living people
Miss Universe 1989 contestants
Miss Universe winners
Miss World 1988 delegates
People from Nieuwerkerk aan den IJssel
Dutch emigrants to the United States